The Unorthodox is a 2018 Israeli film depicting the establishment of the Shas political party. The protagonist, Yaakov Cohen (Shuli Rand), is driven to form a religious political party representing the interests of Sephardic Jews. The incident that drives Cohen is the expulsion of his daughter Heli (Or Lumbrozo) from a Bais Yaakov school, owing to her Sephardic background.

See also 
 Shas (political party)

References 

2018 directorial debut films
Films about elections
Films about Orthodox and Hasidic Jews
Shas